Skey is a surname. Notable people with this surname include:

 Frederic Carpenter Skey (1798–1872), English surgeon
 Larry Skey (1911–1977), Canadian businessman and politician
 Samantha Skey, digital engagement strategist
 William Skey (1835–1900), New Zealand chemist and poet

English-language surnames